KROY (99.7 FM) was an American radio station broadcasting a country music format and licensed to Palacios, Texas. The station was owned by Roy E. Henderson. It had a construction permit to increase to a Class C1 with 100 kW ERP at 476 feet AGL.

History
The station was assigned the call letters KKOS on November 4, 1996. On November 1, 2001, the station changed its call sign to the current KROY (which reflects owner Roy Henderson's first name).

It was announced in June 2014 that KROY would be sold to the KSBJ Educational Foundation, but the sale failed and KSBJ withdrew their offer in March 2016.

On January 11, 2017, the FCC deleted the license of KROY. In addition, they declined the sale of KROY to New Wavo II, Inc., as they determined the license should have expired on December 26, 2010.

References

External links

Radio Insight - KROY Gets Deleted

ROY
Radio stations established in 1997
1997 establishments in Texas
Defunct radio stations in the United States
Radio stations disestablished in 2010
2010 disestablishments in Texas
ROY